According to the Book of Samuel, the Battle of Mizpah (1084 B.C.) was a battle in Israel that occurred when the Ark of the Covenant was captured in the Battle of Aphek.

References 

Mizpah
Books of Samuel
Massacres in the Bible